Meu Pé de Laranja Lima is a novel by José Mauro de Vasconcelos. The book was first published in 1968 and was used for literature classes for elementary schools in Brazil. It has also been translated and published in the US, Europe and Asia.

The novel is part of a tetralogy written by Vasconcelos and centered on different stages in the life of the protagonist, Zeze, and, by extension, Vasconcelos. The four books were published in a disorganized order, following an aleatory chronology instead of a direct one. The direct continuation of the story, Doidão, was actually published in 1963, five years before My Sweet Orange Tree, and follows the life of Zeze during his adolescence.

The book was first published in 1968 by Ed. Melhoramentos in São Paulo, Brazil and was written in Portuguese. A film adaptation was released in 2012.

Plot 
Zeze is a young boy who lives in Bangu, Rio de Janeiro with his underprivileged family. Because everyone is busy trying to support the family, Zeze is usually left by himself with his baby brother Luis, and ends up doing mischievous deeds that make his parents and older siblings so angry that they physically discipline him for what he has done.

After Zeze's father gets fired, the whole family moves, and the new house has a few trees that each of the siblings claims. After having all the trees taken, Zeze gets upset, but one of his older sisters, Gloria, suggests looking in the backyard and Zeze soon discovers a small orange tree. At first, Zeze doesn't like his tree, but he finds out that amazingly, he can communicate with it. He gives the tree a name, Pinkie, and the two become best friends.

Even after meeting a companion, Zeze continues his naughty pranks, and he finally decides to hang on the back of the car of a Portuguese man called Manuel Valadares. Unfortunately Zeze gets busted and Valadares humiliates him in public, causing Zeze to vow to take his revenge. However, Valadares attributes Zeze's attitude to the fact that he's a child and offers Zeze his friendship. With this relationship, Zeze learns what real love is.

The two of them share many memories as good friends, but sadly, Valadares dies in a train accident. Zeze goes through serious mental trauma that causes illness. In the end, Zeze overcomes the trauma, but loses the ability to talk to Pinkie. Zeze also hears the news from his father that he has got a new job and their life will be better. However, Zeze confesses he feels he has killed his father in his mind for the treatment he has given him and expresses sorrow at losing his ‘real’ father, Manuel Valadares.

Film adaptation 

The film adaptation of Meu Pé de Laranja Lima, My Sweet Orange Tree was released in 2012. This movie was directed by Marcos Bernstein and produced by Katia Machoda from Passaro Films. 'MEU PE DE LARANJA LIMA' is classified as foreign film due to its production language Brazilian Portuguese, but was distributed by a few countries like France, Germany and South Korea.

After the release of movie, there is some speculation that points out missing details from adapting a book, but also praises its cinematography. Moreover, the director puts his own twist of story by making Portuga, who becomes Zeze's important figure in life as a true friend, the direct influence to have Zeze become a writer later in movie.

Since the release, My Sweet Orange Tree took parts in many national film festival as well as international ones. To name a few, it debuted in FILMART in 2010 and after that it was a line-up for Cannes in 2010, 2012 and 2013. However, the movie did more than just being a line-ups in various films, but also was a winner. Like in Cinema Brazil Grand Prize 2014, it actually won best children's film and in Zlín International Film Festival for Children and Youth 2013, it won best feature film for children. Also, in 2012, in 7th Rome film festival, it received Alice award as well.

References

1968 Brazilian novels
Brazilian novels adapted into films
Works about trees